Astudillo is a Spanish surname. Notable people with the surname include:

Luciano Astudillo, Swedish politician
Marco Venegas Astudillo (born 1962), Swedish politician
Martín Astudillo (born 1977), Argentine footballer
Pedro "Pete" Astudillo, Texan songwriter
Willians Astudillo, Venezuelan, professional Baseball player

Spanish-language surnames